The BCL2 associated agonist of cell death (BAD) protein is a pro-apoptotic member of the Bcl-2 gene family which is involved in initiating apoptosis. BAD is a member of the BH3-only family, a subfamily of the Bcl-2 family. It does not contain a C-terminal transmembrane domain for outer mitochondrial membrane and nuclear envelope targeting, unlike most other members of the Bcl-2 family. After activation, it is able to form a heterodimer with anti-apoptotic proteins and prevent them from stopping apoptosis.

Mechanism of action 
Bax/Bak are believed to initiate apoptosis by forming a pore in the mitochondrial outer membrane that allows cytochrome c to escape into the cytoplasm and activate the pro-apoptotic caspase cascade.  The anti-apoptotic Bcl-2 and Bcl-xL proteins inhibit cytochrome c release through the mitochondrial pore and also inhibit activation of the cytoplasmic caspase cascade by cytochrome c.

Dephosphorylated BAD forms a heterodimer with Bcl-2 and Bcl-xL, inactivating them and thus allowing Bax/Bak-triggered apoptosis.  When BAD is phosphorylated by Akt/protein kinase B (triggered by PIP3), it forms the BAD-(14-3-3) protein heterodimer.  This leaves Bcl-2 free to inhibit Bax-triggered apoptosis.  BAD phosphorylation is thus anti-apoptotic, and BAD dephosphorylation (e.g., by Ca2+-stimulated Calcineurin) is pro-apoptotic.  The latter may be involved in neural diseases such as schizophrenia.

Interactions 

Bcl-2-associated death promoter has been shown to interact with:

 BCL2L1 
 BCL2A1 
 BCL2L2 
 Bcl-2 
 MCL1 
 S100A10
 YWHAQ  and
 YWHAZ

See also 
Programmed cell death

References

Further reading

External links 
 
 

Programmed cell death
Proteins